Public Nuisance No. 1 is a 1936 British musical comedy film directed by Marcel Varnel and starring Frances Day, Arthur Riscoe and Muriel Aked. It was made at Beaconsfield Studios. The screenplay concerns a young man who goes to work as a waiter at his uncle's hotel in Nice.

Cast
 Frances Day as Frances Travers
 Arthur Riscoe as Arthur Rawlings
 Muriel Aked as Mis Trumps
 Claude Dampier as Feather
 Peter Haddon as Richard Trelawny
 Sebastian Smith as Mr. Snelling
 Robert Nainby as Arthur Rawlings Senior
 Syd Crossley as Policeman
 Anthony Holles as Headwaiter
 Wally Patch as Hotel Doorman (uncredited)

References

Bibliography
 Low, Rachael. Filmmaking in 1930s Britain. George Allen & Unwin, 1985.
 Wood, Linda. British Films, 1927-1939. British Film Institute, 1986.

External links

1936 films
1936 musical comedy films
British black-and-white films
British musical comedy films
1930s English-language films
Films directed by Marcel Varnel
Films scored by Benjamin Frankel
Films shot at Beaconsfield Studios
Films set in hotels
Films set in London
Films set in Nice
1930s British films